Mary Clearman Blew (born 1939) is an American non fiction writer.

Life 

She was born in 1939.

She was born and raised in Montana.

She attended the University of Montana.

Career 

She is a professor of creative writing at the University of Idaho and Pacific Lutheran University.

She has received the Pacific Northwest Booksellers Award and the Western Heritage Award.

Bibliography 

Some of her books are:

 All But the Waltz: A Memoir of Five Generations in the Life of a Montana Family (Viking, 1991)
 This Is Not the Ivy League: A Memoir
 Balsamroot: A Memoir 
 Jackalope Dreams 
 Bone Deep in Landscape: Writing, Reading, and Place

References

External links
 

Living people
American women writers
University of Idaho faculty
Pacific Lutheran University faculty
1939 births
American women academics